Duncanius is a genus of beetles in the family Buprestidae, containing the following species:

 Duncanius australis (Thery, 1954)
 Duncanius capeneri (Cobos, 1953)
 Duncanius capitatus (Kerremans, 1914)
 Duncanius collarti (Thery, 1954)
 Duncanius cylinderus (Kerremans, 1914)
 Duncanius dolatus (Kerremans, 1914)
 Duncanius filiformis (Thery, 1948)
 Duncanius fuellerborni (Thery, 1954)
 Duncanius kerresmani (Thery, 1954)
 Duncanius lineolus (Obenberger, 1928)
 Duncanius malefidus (Thery, 1954)
 Duncanius parallelithorax (Cobos, 1953)
 Duncanius parvulus (Fahraeus, 1851)
 Duncanius schroederi (Thery, 1954)
 Duncanius transversus (Kerremans, 1903)
 Duncanius trapezicollis (Cobos, 1960)
 Duncanius varii (Cobos, 1960)

References

Buprestidae genera